Young Gods is a 2003 film from Finland. The film centres on a group of Finnish teenagers who begin to make videos of themselves and others having sex. Their adventures become more and more extreme, eventually leading to tragic consequences.

It was directed by Jukka-Pekka Siili and stars Jussi Nikkilä.

External links

2003 films
Finnish drama films
Films directed by JP Siili
2000s teen films